Codruț Ștefan Lircă  (born 11 February 1989) is a Romanian footballer who plays as a midfielder for German lower leagues side Rheinweiler. In his career, Lircă played for teams such as Universitatea Cluj, Progresul București, CS Mioveni or CSM Râmnicu Vâlcea, among others. First match in Liga I was for Mioveni against Concordia Chiajna.

References

External links

1989 births
Living people
Romanian footballers
Association football midfielders
Liga I players
Liga II players
FC Argeș Pitești players
FC Universitatea Cluj players
FC Progresul București players
CS Mioveni players
CS Sportul Snagov players
SCM Râmnicu Vâlcea players
FC Voluntari players
Romanian expatriate footballers
Romanian expatriate sportspeople in Germany
Expatriate footballers in Germany
Sportspeople from Pitești